Daniel Quinteros (born 10 March 1976,) is a retired Argentine football midfielder. He last played for Apollon Limassol in the League Marfin Laiki. He is characterised for his passion and commitment in the game with his very successful tackles. He is currently team manager of Apollon Limassol.

Career
Quinteros started his career in 1996 at Rosario Central in the Primera División. During the 1998-1999 season he was loaned to Primera B Nacional club, Almirante Brown. After the loan period he returned to Rosario Central where he stayed until 2003.

Club Atlético Independiente signed him for the 2003-2004 season. And in 2005 he was sold to Club Libertad in Paraguay. In 2006, he returned to Argentina to play for Club Atlético Lanús before signing a four-year deal with  Germinal Beerschot in the Belgian League. However, his contract was terminated by mutual consent on November 5, 2006. Quinteros only played eight first team games for Germinal Beerschot before returning to Argentina to play for Club Atlético Banfield.

References

External links
 Argentine Primera statistics

1976 births
Living people
Argentine footballers
Footballers from Rosario, Santa Fe
Association football midfielders
Rosario Central footballers
Club Atlético Independiente footballers
Beerschot A.C. players
Club Atlético Lanús footballers
Club Atlético Banfield footballers
Apollon Limassol FC players
Club Libertad footballers
Argentine Primera División players
Belgian Pro League players
Cypriot First Division players
Argentine expatriate footballers
Expatriate footballers in Paraguay
Expatriate footballers in Cyprus
Expatriate footballers in Belgium